Thomas Ziegler may refer to:

Thomas Ziegler (ice hockey) (born 1978), Swiss ice hockey player
Thomas Ziegler (cyclist) (born 1980), German road bicycle racer